The 2012–13 Brisbane Bandits season will be the third season for the team. As was the case for the previous season, the Bandits will compete in the Australian Baseball League (ABL) with the other five foundation teams, and will again play its home games at the Brisbane Exhibition Ground.

Offseason

Regular season

Standings

Record vs opponents

Game log 

|- bgcolor=#ffbbbb
| 1
| 9 November
| @ 
| 0–8
| C. Oxspring
| J. Staatz
| -
| 815
| 0-1
| 
|- bgcolor=#bbffbb
| 2
| 10 November
| @ 
| 3–1
| J. Erasmus
| T. Van Steensel
| -
| 1,180
| 1-1
| 
|- bgcolor=#bbffbb
| 3
| 11 November
| @ 
| 5–2
| C. Smith
| V. Harris
| J. Veitch
| 821
| 2-1
| 
|- bgcolor=#ffbbbb
| 4
| 16 November
| 
| 2–3
| B. Grening 
| J. Staatz
| S. Toler
| 537
| 2-2
| 
|- bgcolor=#bbffbb
| 5
| 17 November (DH 1)
| 
| 1–0
| C. Smith
| R. Dickmann
| 
| 613
| 3-2
| 
|- bgcolor=#bbbbbb
| 6
| 18 November (DH 2)
| 
| 6–1 (after 3 innings)
| 
| 
| 
| 
| 
| 
|- bgcolor=#bbffbb
| 7
| 22 November
| @ 
| 6–2
| J. Staatz
| D. Ruzic
| 
| 795
| 4-2
| 
|- bgcolor=#ffbbbb
| 8
| 23 November
| @ 
| 6–7
| Z. Fuesser
| J. Albury
| A. Kittredge
| 2,125
| 4-3
| 
|- bgcolor=#ffbbbb
| 9
| 24 November (DH 1)
| @ 
| 2–5
| D. Fidge
| C. Smith
| A. Kittredge
| 
| 4-4
| 
|- bgcolor=#bbffbb
| 10
| 24 November (DH 2)
| @ 
| 7–3
| R. Searle
| W. Lee
| 
| 1,345
| 5-4
| 
|- bgcolor=#ffbbbb
| 11
| 30 November
| 
| 3–8
| C. Oxspring
| C. Lofgren
| 
| 432
| 5-5
| 
|-

|- bgcolor=#bbffbb
| 12
| 1 December (DH 1)
| 
| 3–2
| J. Erasmus
| W. Lundgren
| R. Searle
| 
| 6-5
| 
|- bgcolor=#ffbbbb
| 13
| 1 December (DH 1)
| 
| 2–3
| C. Anderson
| J. Erasmus
| M. Williams
| 481
| 6-6
| 
|- bgcolor=#ffbbbb
| 14
| 2 December
| 
| 2–9
| T. Cox
| J. Staatz
| 
| 666
| 6-7
| 
|- bgcolor=#bbffbb
| 15
| 7 December
| @ 
| 6–4
| C. Lofgren
| V. Vasquez
| R. Searle
| 1,303
| 7-7
| 
|- bgcolor=#ffbbbb
| 16
| 8 December (DH 1)
| @ 
| 2–3
| S. Mitchinson
| C. Smith
| C. Lamb
|  
| 7-8
| 
|- bgcolor=#ffbbbb
| 17
| 8 December (DH 2)
| @ 
| 3–4
| M. Zachary
| J. Erasmus
| W. Saupold
| 1,748
| 7-9
| 
|- bgcolor=#bbffbb
| 18
| 9 December
| @ 
| 5–1
| J. Kilby
| D. Schmidt
| 
| 1,359
| 8-9
| 
|-
| 19
| 13 December
| 
| –
| 
| 
| 
| 
| 
| 
|-
| 20
| 14 December (DH 1)
| 
| –
| 
| 
| 
| 
| 
| 
|-
| 21
| 14 December (DH 2)
| 
| –
| 
| 
| 
| 
| 
| 
|-
| 22
| 15 December
| 
| –
| 
| 
| 
| 
| 
| 
|-
| 23
| 20 December
| @ 
| –
| 
| 
| 
| 
| 
| 
|-
| 24
| 21 December
| @ 
| –
| 
| 
| 
| 
| 
| 
|-
| 25
| 22 December
| @ 
| –
| 
| 
| 
| 
| 
| 
|-
| 26
| 23 December
| @ 
| –
| 
| 
| 
| 
| 
| 
|-
| 27
| 27 December
| 
| –
| 
| 
| 
| 
| 
| 
|-
| 28
| 28 December
| 
| –
| 
| 
| 
| 
| 
| 
|-
| 29
| 29 December
| 
| –
| 
| 
| 
| 
| 
|
|-
| 30
| 30 December
| 
| –
| 
| 
| 
| 
| 
| 
|-

|-
| 31
| 3 January
| @ 
| –
| 
| 
| 
| 
| 
| 
|-
| 32
| 4 January
| @ 
| –
| 
| 
| 
| 
| 
| 
|-
| 33
| 5 January
| @ 
| –
| 
| 
| 
| 
| 
| 
|-
| 34
| 6 January
| @ 
| –
| 
| 
| 
| 
| 
| 
|-
| 35
| 11 January
| 
| –
| 
| 
| 
| 
| 
| 
|-
| 36
| 12 January (DH 1)
| 
| –
| 
| 
| 
| 
| 
| 
|-
| 37
| 12 January (DH 2)
| 
| –
| 
| 
| 
| 
| 
| 
|-
| 38
| 13 January
| 
| –
| 
| 
| 
| 
| 
| 
|-
| 39
| 18 January
| 
| –
| 
| 
| 
| 
| 
| 
|-
| 40
| 19 January (DH 1)
| 
| –
| 
| 
| 
| 
| 
| 
|-
| 41
| 19 January (DH 2)
| 
| –
| 
| 
| 
| 
| 
| 
|-
| 42
| 20 January
| 
| –
| 
| 
| 
| 
| 
| 
|-
| 43
| 24 January
| @ 
| –
| 
| 
| 
| 
| 
| 
|-
| 44
| 25 January
| @ 
| –
| 
| 
| 
| 
| 
| 
|-
| 45
| 26 January
| @ 
| –
| 
| 
| 
| 
| 
| 
|-
| 46
| 27 January
| @ 
| –
| 
| 
| 
| 
| 
| 
|-

Roster

References 

Brisbane Bandits
Brisbane Bandits